Parsonsia diaphanophleba is a woody vine of the family Apocynaceae. It is found in Western Australia and is listed as a priority 4 (rare, threatened, or in need of monitoring) species.

Description
Parsonsia diaphanophleba is a vine, whose woody stems can reach up to 10 m high,  Flowering from January to February, April to June or September, its flowers are white/cream and pink.

Distribution and habitat
Parsonsia diaphanophleba occurs in Jarrah forest on the Swan Coastal Plain in the southwest of Western Australia, growing on alluvial soils along rivers.

Taxonomy
Parsonsia diaphanophleba was first described in 1861, by Ferdinand von Mueller, and later redescribed, in 1868, as Lyonsia diaphanophlebia  by Bentham, who adjusted the Latin of  the basionym (the earliest name) to Parsonsia diaphanophlebia. Its currently accepted name is Parsonsia diaphanophleba.

References

diaphanophlebia
Gentianales of Australia
Endemic flora of Southwest Australia
Plants described in 1861
Vines
Taxa named by Ferdinand von Mueller